Seth A. Blair (born March 3, 1989) is an American professional baseball pitcher who plays in the Mexican Pacific League for the Águilas de Mexicali. Before playing professionally, he played college baseball for the Arizona State Sun Devils. Standing at 6 feet 2 inches (1.88 m) and 185 pounds (84 kg), he throws and punches right-handed.

Amateur career
Blair attended Rock Falls High School, where he starred for the school's baseball team. He was also invited to compete in tournaments, including the 2005 Junior Olympics. He was selected by the Oakland Athletics of Major League Baseball (MLB) in the 47th round of the 2007 MLB draft, but opted to attend college rather than sign with the Athletics. He then enrolled at Arizona State University, where he played college baseball for the Arizona State Sun Devils in the Pacific-10 Conference. He formed a strong starting rotation along with Mike Leake and Josh Spence. In 2008 and 2009, he played collegiate summer baseball with the Cotuit Kettleers of the Cape Cod Baseball League and was named a league all-star in 2008. In 2010, he was named the Pacific-10 Pitcher of the Year, and an All-American according to the American Baseball Coaches Association and Baseball America.

The St. Louis Cardinals selected Blair in the first round, with the 46th overall selection, of the 2010 MLB draft. At the time of the draft, he had a 12–0 win–loss record, a 3.06 earned run average (ERA), 98 strikeouts and 22 walks in 97 innings pitched for the Sun Devils that season.  He finished his Arizona State career with a 23–5 record.

Professional career
Blair signed with the Cardinals in July 2010. In 2011, he had a 6–3 win–loss record with a 5.29 ERA for the Quad Cities River Bandits of the Class A Midwest League. The team dismissed Blair during their postseason for violating team rules.

Out of spring training in 2012, the Cardinals assigned Blair to the Palm Beach Cardinals of the Class A-Advanced Florida State League. In April 2012, following pain experienced while throwing, Blair was diagnosed with an enchondroma, a benign tumor in a joint of his middle finger on his pitching hand. He returned to Palm Beach late in the season, recording a 5.40 ERA in  innings. After the 2012 season, the Cardinals assigned him to the Surprise Saguaros of the Arizona Fall League, where he had a 2–1 record, a 2.25 ERA, 22 strikeouts, and 14 walks in 20 innings pitched. Blair pitched for the Springfield Cardinals of the Double-A Texas League in 2013, where he had a 5.07 ERA in 22 starts, but finished strong in his final seven starts. He was assigned to Springfield to start the 2014 season.

Blair was released by the Cardinals after the 2014 season, and left baseball. He returned to baseball in 2019, playing for the Lake Elsinore Storm of the Class A-Advanced California League. During the COVID-19 pandemic, he opened up his backyard training site for other pitchers. In August 2020, Blair signed with the Boston Red Sox and was added to their 60-man player pool. In early November 2020, he was re-signed by the Red Sox to a minor-league deal for the 2021 season, and was selected as a non-roster invitee to major league spring training in 2021. Blair began the 2021 season in Triple-A with the Worcester Red Sox, and was reassigned to the Double-A Portland Sea Dogs in late May. Overall during 2021, he appeared in 32 games (one start) compiling a 3.10 ERA, 3–2 record, and two saves while striking out 51 batters in  innings.

On March 11, 2022, Blair signed a minor league contract with the Tampa Bay Rays. Blair made 21 appearances for the Triple-A Durham Bulls, battling to an 0-3 record and a 7.61 ERA with 17 strikeouts in 23.2 innings pitched. On July 8, he was released by the Rays organization. For that same year in October to play for the Águilas de Mexicali in the Mexican Pacific League and in January as a reinforcement for the Estrellas Orientales in Lidom.

Personal life
Blair's father, Al, played college baseball for Southern Illinois University and Illinois State University. His brother, Shane, played baseball as a catcher on the Rock Falls high school team.

References

External links

1989 births
Living people
People from Rock Falls, Illinois
Baseball players from Illinois
Baseball pitchers
Arizona State Sun Devils baseball players
Quad Cities River Bandits players
Gulf Coast Cardinals players
Palm Beach Cardinals players
Springfield Cardinals players
Surprise Saguaros players
Memphis Redbirds players
Cotuit Kettleers players
Lake Elsinore Storm players
Worcester Red Sox players
Portland Sea Dogs players